Spanbroekmolen British Cemetery is a Commonwealth War Graves Commission (CWGC) burial ground for the dead of the First World War located in the Ypres Salient on the Western Front in Belgium. It is located at Spanbroekmolen, on one of the highest points of the Messines Ridge.

Foundation
The cemetery, named after a nearby windmill, was established in summer 1917. It mainly contains burials from the first day of the Battle of Messines, plus one from the day after. As in Lone Tree War Cemetery nearby, many of those buried here were from the 36th (Ulster) Division.

The cemetery was destroyed in later fighting and was reconstructed after the Armistice. Six graves could not be located and a "special memorial" notes the names of the men whose graves were not found.

Some of the men buried here were killed by the force of the explosion of a mine placed by the British Royal Engineers. The explosion crater, now filled with water, still exists and is called "Spanbroekmolenkrater" or "Lone Tree Crater". It was acquired in 1929 by the Toc H foundation in Poperinge, today recognised as the "Pool of Peace".

The cemetery was designed by J. R. Truelove. The cemetery grounds were assigned to the United Kingdom in perpetuity by King Albert I of Belgium in recognition of the sacrifices made by the British Empire in the defence and liberation of Belgium during the war.

References

Bibliography

External links
 
 Spanbroekmolen British Cemetery at Find a Grave

Commonwealth War Graves Commission cemeteries in Belgium
Heuvelland
Cemeteries and memorials in West Flanders
World War I cemeteries in Belgium